Thomas Charles Byde Rooke (18 May 1806 – 28 November 1858) was an English physician who married into the royal family of the Kingdom of Hawaii. He built a mansion called the Rooke House in Honolulu that became popular with political and social leaders of the Kingdom.

Life
He was born on 18 May 1806 in Bengeo, Hertfordshire, England. His father was Thomas Rooke (1769–1814) and mother was Sarah Paillet Draper (died 1815).

He trained at St Bartholomew's Hospital in London and arrived in Honolulu about 1829 on an English whaling ship. In 1830 he married Grace Kamaikui Young (1808–1866). In 1844 he met Abraham Fornander who worked for him surveying and supervising a coffee plantation.

Rooke House

Rooke built a house some time in the 1830s.
It was used for medical practice, a large library, and for entertaining guests. It included a coach house and living quarters for kahu ("servants"). A wide veranda swept the front of the house, and four pillars supported the roof. The ground floor was Rooke's clinic and dispensary. The family lived upstairs, in a style redolent of a British manor house, with red Kashmir carpets, mahogany and dark oak furniture, and framed oil paintings. It was on the ma kai-Waikiki (southwest) corner of Beretania and Nuuanu Avenue and bordered by Fort Street and Chaplain Lane, . The one-and-a-half-acre parcel, called Kaopuana ("Raincloud"), was probably the gift of Kamehameha III.

On 16 December 1835, Grace's father John Young died, mostly likely in Rooke House, with the Young and Isaac Davis family present.  Dr. Rooke had been caring for the nonagenarian British sailor during his illness. Three weeks after the Young's death, a girl Emma was born, the granddaughter of Young, daughter of Fanny Young and the hānai (adoptive) daughter of the Rookes. 
Much later, the house witnessed the death of two others of the Young family: James Kānehoa, Grace Rooke's half-brother, and Kaōanaeha, her mother.

Popularly known as "Rooke House", the residence was known throughout Honolulu for its hospitality.  Grace Rooke, steeped in her mother's alii tradition of hookipa (hospitality), was a gracious hostess.  Dr. Rooke, always elegantly attired, complemented his naturally shy wife with his open, gregarious, and forthright manner.  Rooke House, for most of Emma's childhood, was a place of elaborate dinners, parties, teas and receptions.  Visiting families included those of Abner Paki, John Owen Dominis, Captain John Paty and Skinner, and the King. This affirmed their high status in business and political circles.

Isabella Bird, who visited Queen Emma in 1873, described as Rooke House as "the most English-looking house I have seen since I left home, except Bishopscourt at Melbourne." During the Royal Election of 1874 between Emma and David Kalakaua over who would succeed William Charles Lunalilo, Rooke House served as a gathering place for the supporters of Queen Emma,  called Emmaites or Queenites.  The residence was the scene of mass gatherings of Hawaiians and some British with chants celebrating Emma's rightful claim to the throne.

During the 1900s it was a kindergarten named Queen Emma Hall in honor of the last owner of the house. Later the site of Rooke House was occupied by the Liberty Theater (which closed in 1980) and now it's a parking lot.

Later life

Rooke served as a representative to the legislature of the Hawaiian Kingdom from 1851–1855, and in 1858 was appointed to the Privy Council.

He was a founding member of the first Hawaii Medical Association, along with Charles Guillou, William Hillebrand and Gerrit P. Judd in 1856.
In 1856 his adoptive daughter became Queen Consort Emma when she married King Kamehameha IV.
He brought two influences from his native land: Anglicanism and Freemasonry. He attended his adopted son-in-law Kamehameha IV's Freemason initiation ceremony in January 1857.

Rooke died of apoplexy on 28 November 1858, at Kailua-Kona. He was buried in the cemetery on the Iolani Palace grounds and later his remains were transferred to the at the Royal Mausoleum of Hawaii. He was one of the only four Europeans allowed to be buried at the Royal Mausoleum of Hawaii.

If Rooke had lived a few months longer, he would have seen the establishment of The Queen's Medical Center, established through funds raised by Emma and Kamehameha IV.  His medical instruments were donated to the hospital.

He owned some land in a part of Nuuanu valley called Waolani that came to ne known as "Rooke's Valley". Queen Emma's uncle Keoni Ana, the premier, built a summer home in Nu`uanu called Hānaiakamālama and bequeathed it to Emma.  Used as a summer retreat by Kamehameha IV and Queen Emma, it is now a museum.
Another part of the land became the Oahu Country Club golf course.
He also owned some land on Kauai island.

Family tree

References

19th-century English medical doctors
1806 births
1858 deaths
Royalty of the Hawaiian Kingdom
Burials at the Royal Mausoleum (Mauna ʻAla)
Hawaiian Kingdom politicians
Members of the Hawaiian Kingdom House of Representatives
Members of the Hawaiian Kingdom Privy Council
Hawaiian Kingdom Anglicans
Physicians from Hawaii